Bawa Mumuni (born 13 October 1986) is a Ghanaian football player who last played for Vietnamese Second Division club Nam Dinh. He is a central defender.

Career
He began his football career in 2001 with Fauzan F.C. before he moved to Liberty Professionals FC. Where he was made the captain of the team. In December 2008 Mumuni left his club Liberty Professionals FC on loan to Bendel Insurance F.C., after his return in October 2009 he signed for Accra Hearts of Oak SC. The 2008 league champions and the most successful club in Ghanaian top league on 7 October 2009 he signed a new contract with them. Best defender Ghana Premier League 2007/2008. Most disciplined player 2008/2009 League season.

References

1986 births
Living people
Ghanaian footballers
Association football defenders
Liberty Professionals F.C. players
Bendel Insurance F.C. players
Expatriate footballers in Nigeria
Accra Hearts of Oak S.C. players
Ghanaian expatriate footballers
Ghanaian expatriate sportspeople in Nigeria
Expatriate footballers in Vietnam